Monardella stebbinsii is a rare species of flowering plant in the mint family known by the common names Feather River monardella and Stebbins' monardella. It is endemic to Plumas County, California, where it is known from only about ten occurrences along the North Fork of the Feather River in the High Sierra. It is a member of the serpentine soils flora in rocky mountain habitat.

Description
Monardella stebbinsii is a perennial herb forming a mat or clump of densely hairy stems. The purple-gray hairy leaves are oval in shape and arranged oppositely on the stems. The inflorescence is a head of several flowers blooming in a small cup of leathery purplish bracts. The pink flowers are between 1 and 2 centimeters long.

Further reading
 Hardham, C. B. and J. A. Bartel. (1990). Monardella stebbinsii (Lamiaceae), a new serpentine endemic species from the northern Sierra Nevada, Plumas County, California. Aliso 12:693–699.

External links
 Calflora Database: Monardella stebbinsii 
 Jepson Manual eFlora (TJM2) treatment of Monardella stebbinsii
 USDA Plants Profile
 Monardella stebbinsii − Photo gallery

stebbinsii
Endemic flora of California
Flora of the Sierra Nevada (United States)
Feather River
Natural history of Plumas County, California
Plants described in 1990
Critically endangered flora of California